Brevundimonas humi is a Gram-negative, non-spore-forming, rod-shaped, aerobic and motile bacterium from the genus of Brevundimonas which has been isolated from forest soil from the Kyonggi University in Korea.

References

Bacteria described in 2018
Caulobacterales